diagrams.net (previously draw.io) is a free and open source cross-platform graph drawing software developed in HTML5 and JavaScript. Its interface can be used to create diagrams such as flowcharts, wireframes, UML diagrams, organizational charts, and network diagrams.

diagrams.net is available as online cross-browser web app, and as offline desktop application for Linux, macOS, and Windows. Its offline application is built using the Electron framework. The web app does not require online login or registration and can open from and save to the local hard drive. Supported storage and export formats to download include PNG, JPEG, SVG, and PDF.

It also integrates with cloud services for storage including Dropbox, OneDrive, Google Drive, GitHub, and GitLab.com.

It is also available as plugin to embed the web app in platforms such as NextCloud, MediaWiki, Notion, Atlassian Confluence, and Jira.

It has been described by tech reviewers such as TechRadar and PCMag as an alternative to Lucidchart, Microsoft Visio, and SmartDraw.

History

JGraph Ltd 
JGraph Ltd is a private limited company founded by Gaudenz Alder and David Benson in 2000 in the United Kingdom.

JGraph 
JGraph started as a pure Java language software project by Gaudenz Alder and as a University project in 2000 at ETH Zurich, Switzerland. The initial public release of JGraph 1.0 was in May 2002. The original design for JGraph was to make it an architectural extension of the Swing Java-toolkit and its JTree class.

mxGraph 
In 2005, development began on mxGraph, which is a graph drawing software library written in JavaScript using HTML5 and SVG technologies. The project was publicly released in 2006, and supported Firefox 1.5 and Internet Explorer 5.5.

mxGraph was originally made available as freeware through a hosted demo of the software for online use, with publicly available source under a end-user license agreement for non-commercial use with the option to purchse a commercial license.

In 2009, mxGraph was open sourced under the Apache license. JGraph also bundled official ports of mxGraph in other languages including Java, C#, and PHP.

JGraphX 
After the final JGraph 5.x release in February 2010, the project renamed its Java-language application to JGraphX, integrated the mxGraph library, and took on mxGraph's version numbering, starting with JGraphX 1.10.0.5 released in 2012.

Diagramly 
In 2011, the company started publishing its hosted service for the mxGraph web application under a separate brand, Diagramly with the domain "diagram.ly".

After removing the remaining use of Java applets from its web app, the service rebranded as draw.io in 2012 because the ".io suffix is a lot cooler than .ly", said co-founder David Benson in a 2012 interview.

In February 2020, the company announced on its blog that the hosted version of the web application would move from "draw.io" to the "diagrams.net" domain, citing security reasons. The move was completed a month later. The software library, file format, and integrated services remain branded as "drawio".

See also
JUNG
NetworkX, a Python library for studying graphs and networks.
Dia (software)

References

External links
 
 
 Java API for working with Drawio diagrams

Java (programming language) libraries
Free data visualization software
Data visualization software
Diagramming software
Windows software